Lhofei Shiozawa (10 July 1941 – 3 November 2008) was a Brazilian judoka. He competed at the 1964 Summer Olympics and the 1972 Summer Olympics.

References

External links
 

1941 births
2008 deaths
Brazilian male judoka
Olympic judoka of Brazil
Judoka at the 1964 Summer Olympics
Judoka at the 1972 Summer Olympics
Sportspeople from São Paulo
Pan American Games medalists in judo
Pan American Games gold medalists for Brazil
Pan American Games silver medalists for Brazil
Judoka at the 1963 Pan American Games
Judoka at the 1967 Pan American Games
Medalists at the 1963 Pan American Games
Medalists at the 1967 Pan American Games
20th-century Brazilian people
21st-century Brazilian people